Manuel "Manolo" Raga Navarro (born March 14, 1944) is a Mexican former professional basketball player. During his playing career, he was nicknamed, "The Flying Mexican", due to his nationality and his one of a kind 43 inch standing (no step) vertical leap. In 2008, he was named one of the 50 Greatest EuroLeague Contributors. In 2016, he became a FIBA Hall of Fame player.

Club career
Raga played professionally for Varese in the Italian League, from 1968 to 1974, and with them, he won three EuroLeague championships. In 1970, he became the first player from an international league to be selected in the NBA Draft, when Atlanta Hawks general manager, Marty Blake, took him with the 167th overall pick. However, Raga never played in the NBA.

National team career
Raga was a part of the senior national team of Mexico. He won a gold medal at the 1965 CentroBasket, and a silver medal at the 1967 Pan American Games. He also played with Mexico in three different Summer Olympic Games, at the 1964 Summer Olympics, the 1968 Summer Olympics, and the 1976 Summer Olympics. He also played in 3 different FIBA World Cups, at Brazil 1963, at Uruguay 1967, and at Puerto Rico 1974.

Awards and accomplishments

Club career
 Italian League Champion (3): 1969, 1970, 1971
 Italian Cup Winner (3): 1969, 1970, 1971
 FIBA European Champions Cup (EuroLeague) Champion (3): 1969–70, 1971–72, 1972–73
 FIBA Intercontinental Cup Champion (2): 1970, 1973
 Swiss League Champion (3): 1974–75, 1975–76, 1976–77
 Swiss Cup Winner: 1974–75
 Best Mexican Player of the 20th Century
 50 Greatest EuroLeague Contributors: 2008
 FIBA Hall of Fame: 2016

References

External links
Euroleague.net 50 Greatest EuroLeague Contributors
FIBA Hall of Fame Profile
FIBA Profile
Basketball-Reference.com Profile
The Flying Mexican
Manuel Raga, Mexico, InterBasket. Retrieved 20 August 2007.

1944 births
Living people
Atlanta Hawks draft picks
Basketball players at the 1964 Summer Olympics
Basketball players at the 1967 Pan American Games
Basketball players at the 1968 Summer Olympics
Basketball players at the 1976 Summer Olympics
Basketball players from Tamaulipas
FIBA Hall of Fame inductees
Mexican men's basketball players
1963 FIBA World Championship players
1967 FIBA World Championship players
1974 FIBA World Championship players
Olympic basketball players of Mexico
Pallacanestro Varese players
Pan American Games medalists in basketball
Pan American Games silver medalists for Mexico
Shooting guards
SP Federale Lugano players
Medalists at the 1967 Pan American Games